Summit Township is the name of some places in the U.S. state of Pennsylvania:

Summit Township, Butler County, Pennsylvania
Summit Township, Crawford County, Pennsylvania
Summit Township, Erie County, Pennsylvania
Summit Township, Potter County, Pennsylvania
Summit Township, Somerset County, Pennsylvania

Pennsylvania township disambiguation pages